Marc C. Duff (born July 4, 1961) is a former member of the Wisconsin State Assembly.

Biography
Duff was born on July 4, 1961, in Port Washington, Wisconsin. He graduated from New Berlin Eisenhower Middle/High School in New Berlin, Wisconsin as well as the University of Wisconsin-Whitewater and the Robert M. La Follette Institute of Public Affairs at the University of Wisconsin-Madison. Duff is married with two children.

Career
Duff was first elected to the Assembly in 1988. He was also a member of the Waukesha County, Wisconsin Board from 1988 to 1989. Duff was elected as a Republican.

Duff was the CFO of Racine Unified School District in Racine, Wisconsin and retired in April, 2021. Duff remains active in school business management.

References

People from Port Washington, Wisconsin
People from New Berlin, Wisconsin
County supervisors in Wisconsin
Republican Party members of the Wisconsin State Assembly
University of Wisconsin–Whitewater alumni
Robert M. La Follette School of Public Affairs alumni
1961 births
Living people
American chief financial officers